John Hanson is a former association football player who represented New Zealand at international level.

Hanson made his full All Whites debut in a 2–0 win over Chinese Taipei on 20 March 1988 and ended his international playing career with four official caps to his credit, his fourth and final cap an appearance in a 0–1 loss to Fiji on 19 November 1988.

References 

Year of birth missing (living people)
Living people
New Zealand association footballers
New Zealand international footballers
Association football forwards